Joy A. San Buenaventura (born 1959) is a Filipino-born American Democratic politician from Hawaii. She represented District 4 in the Hawaii House of Representatives and is currently a member of the Hawaii Senate from the 2nd district.

Political career 
San Buenaventura first entered the Hawaii political scene when she ran for the District 4 Democratic nomination for the Hawaii House of Representatives. The Democratic primary was a crowded one that included four challengers, including San Buenaventura, and incumbent representative Faye Hanohano, who had held the seat since 2006. San Buenaventura emerged as the only challenger to top Hanohano, and won the primary carrying 43.4% of the vote. In the general election, she faced Republican nominee Gary Thomas, whom she defeated by 43 points. She assumed office in the House in January 2015.

San Buenaventura opted to run for reelection to a second term in 2016, and faced no opposition from fellow Democrats. She advanced automatically to the general election, where she carried 75.5% of the vote against nonpartisan Luana Jones and Constitution Party candidate Moke Stephens. In 2018, San Buenaventura was elected to a third term in the House after she won the primary with no opposition and was later declared the winner of the race after the general election was cancelled.  San Buenaventura was Majority Whip, Chair of the House Human Services and Homelessness Committee, and Vice-chair of the House Judiciary Committee.

In May 2020, San Buenaventura announced that she would run for the District 2 seat in the Hawaii Senate, which was being vacated by outgoing Senator Russell Ruderman. She defeated Democratic challenger Smiley Burrows in the August 8 primary, carrying 78.7% of the vote, and advanced to the general election in November to face Aloha ʻĀina Party candidate Ron Ka-Ipo. San Buenaventura is currently the Chair of the Senate Committee on Human Services, a member of the Senate Committee on Commerce and Consumer Protection, and the Committee on Health.

Electoral history

Hawaii House of Representatives

Hawaii Senate

References

External links 
 Official website
 Hawaii State Legislature
 Facebook
 Instagram
 Twitter

American politicians of Filipino descent
Hawaii politicians of Filipino descent
Asian-American people in Hawaii politics
People from Hawaii (island)
Democratic Party members of the Hawaii House of Representatives
21st-century American politicians
21st-century American women politicians
Women state legislators in Hawaii
Living people
1959 births
University of Nevada, Las Vegas alumni
University of California, Hastings College of the Law alumni
American lawyers
Filipino emigrants to the United States